George Oxenden may refer to:

 Sir George Oxenden (governor) (1620–1669), first governor of the Bombay Presidency
 George Oxenden (lawyer) (1651–1703), English academic, lawyer and politician who sat in the House of Commons from 1685 to 1689
 Sir George Oxenden, 5th Baronet (1694–1775), English Whig politician who sat in the House of Commons from 1720 to 1754